Weldon River is stream in Clark and Decatur counties in southern Iowa and Grundy and Mercer counties in northern Missouri of the United States.  It is a tributary of the Thompson River. The confluence is two miles northwest of Trenton. It has an average discharge of 246 cubic feet per second at Mill Grove.

Weldon River most likely was named after James Weldon, a pioneer settler.

References

Rivers of Clarke County, Iowa
Rivers of Decatur County, Iowa
Rivers of Grundy County, Missouri
Rivers of Mercer County, Missouri
Rivers of Iowa
Rivers of Missouri